A dragging death is a death caused by someone being dragged behind or underneath a moving vehicle or animal, whether accidental or as a deliberate act of murder.

Instances of dragging death
 Antonio Curcoa (1792)
 James Byrd Jr. (1998)
 João Hélio (2007)
 Brandon McClelland (2008)
 Mido Macia (2013)
 Farkhunda Malikzada (2015)
 Andrew Harper (2019)

See also
 Keel-hauling

References

Causes of death
Murder
Murders by motor vehicle